Trzy Chałupy ("three cottages") may refer to the following villages in Poland:

Trzy Chałupy, Oleśnica County
Trzy Chałupy, Trzebnica County

See also
Chałupy (disambiguation)